Mukunda Prasad Das (12 August 1893–7 November 1969) was an Indian Lawyer and politician. Das had served as the First Pre-independence Speaker of the Odisha Legislative Assembly from 28 July 1937 to 29 May 1946.

References 

1893 births
1969 deaths
Speakers of the Odisha Legislative Assembly